The Coosa chiefdom was a powerful Native American paramount chiefdom in what are now Gordon and Murray counties in Georgia, in the United States. It was inhabited from about 1400 until about 1600, and dominated several smaller chiefdoms. The total population of Coosa's area of influence, reaching into present-day Tennessee and Alabama, has been estimated at 50,000.

Hernando de Soto and his conquistadors visited Coosa on their expedition through the Southeast United States in 1539–1541, as did participants in Tristán de Luna's expedition in 1560, and Juan Pardo's 1566–1568 expedition. The Europeans recorded descriptions and impressions of the various chiefdoms they visited, describing Coosa as a series of communities and fertile gardens containing much food, rather than a town or city. 

Coosa was also the name of one of the four mother towns of the Muscogee Creek confederacy.

History

The Coosa chiefdom was centered at a site along the Coosawattee River in present-day Gordon and Murray counties in northwestern Georgia. The capital of Coosa, it had a large plaza and three platform mounds, as well as residential dwellings. Researchers have found various Mississippian culture pottery types, the most substantial of which reflect the site's Middle and Late South Appalachian Mississippian culture (a regional variation of the Mississippian culture) habitation from 1300 to 1600. 

Archeologists, who nicknamed this settlement as "Little Egypt", have defined these as the Dallas, Lamar, and Mouse Creek phases of pottery. These type variations could indicate that the chiefdom underwent three archaeological phases and changes in culture, each with distinct pottery and artifact styles. Only one other village had a mound; the others associated with the chiefdom had only residential dwellings.

Hernando de Soto and his expedition entered the Coosa chiefdom in 1540. Chroniclers recorded that the chiefdom consisted of eight villages. Archaeologists have identified the remains of seven of these, including the capital. The population of the Coosa is thought to have been between about 2,500 to 4,650 people. The chief of Coosa ruled over a significantly wider confederation of other chiefdoms, whose territory spread 400 miles along the Appalachian Mountains across present-day northern Georgia into eastern Tennessee and central Alabama. These populations totaled in the tens of thousands. This "paramount chiefdom consisted of seven or more smaller chiefdoms, representing about 50,000 people."

Following contact with Europeans and the associated introduction of endemic Old World diseases, the populations of the Coosa and other local chiefdoms suffered extensive fatalities from the new diseases. The societies went into precipitous decline and suffered great disruption by the loss of so  much life. By the close of the 16th century, most of the core area of the Coosa was abandoned. The surviving population withdrew to a few villages along the Coosa River in Alabama. One such settlement was the King site, a small heavily fortified village of 277 to 517 people and 47 houses.

Linguistics
The chroniclers of the de Soto Expedition recorded the name of the Coosa as Coça. The early French maps recorded several member towns of the Creek Confederacy as being occupied by the Cousha or Coushetta, in their transliterated form of the name as they heard it.

The Cherokee first appeared to use the word kusa to mean the Muskogee Creek people of the Upper Towns, who were competitors and enemies.  According to James Mooney, they called the Muskogee Creek "Ani'-Ku'sa or Ani'-Gu'sa, from Kusa, their principal town". English speakers adopted "Coosa" as a frontier English version of the early Cherokee word. The contemporary Cherokee name for all Creek Indians is ani-kusa. This is also the name for Muskogee, Oklahoma: ᎫᏐᎢ, guso'i. The name for the Muskogee Creek people, in the revised Cherokee syllabary of ᎦᎳᎩᎾ/Elias Boudinot, is spelled ᎠᏂᎫᏌ. A singular Muskogee Creek person is ᎠᎫᏌ, "agusa," according to the Cherokee-English Dictionary (Cherokee Nation of Oklahoma: Feeling & Pulte, 1975).

See also
 List of sites and peoples visited by the Hernando de Soto Expedition
 Cusabo
 Mississippian culture
 Southeastern Ceremonial Complex
 Four Mothers Society
 Abihka
 Tuckabutche
 Tallapoosas

Notes

References
 Fagan, Brian. Ancient North America: The Archaeology of a Continent. London: Thames and Hudson, 2005. pp. 487–488
 Hudson, Charles M., Knights of Spain, Warriors of the Sun: Hernando De Soto and the South's Ancient Chiefdoms, University of Georgia Press, 1997. 
 Hudson, Charles M., Conversations with the High Priest of Coosa, Chapel Hill, NC: University of North Carolina Press, 2003. 

Native American tribes in Georgia (U.S. state)
South Appalachian Mississippian culture
Late Mississippian culture
Muscogee tribal towns
Former chiefdoms in North America
Gordon County, Georgia
Murray County, Georgia